Mitchaw is an unincorporated community in Lucas County, in the U.S. state of Ohio.

History
A post office called Mitchaw was established in 1883, and remained in operation until 1901. Mitchaw was severely damaged in the 1920 Palm Sunday tornado outbreak.

References

Unincorporated communities in Lucas County, Ohio
Unincorporated communities in Ohio